Sky3 Place is a 15-story, mixed-use tower in Portland, Oregon, in the United States.

See also
 List of tallest buildings in Portland, Oregon

References

Buildings and structures in Portland, Oregon